In 1997, the Women's National Basketball Association was created. In order to give new teams reasonable talent, the league decided to have two drafts. There was the normal collegiate draft that most professional sports leagues hold. There was also the WNBA elite draft. The elite draft allowed teams to pick players that have already graduated from college and have gone on to play professionally on other American teams or overseas.

The following is the list of how players were picked in the 1997 WNBA elite draft. After this draft, the normal collegiate draft took place.

Round 1

Round 2

Elite